is a Japanese football player for Fukuyama City FC.

Career
Sho Tanaka joined J3 League club Grulla Morioka in 2017.

Club statistics
Updated to 29 August 2018.

References

External links

Profile at J. League
Profile at Grulla Morioka

1994 births
Living people
Toin University of Yokohama alumni
Association football people from Tokyo
Japanese footballers
J3 League players
Iwate Grulla Morioka players
Association football defenders